is a 2016-2017 Japanese tokusatsu web series, serving as a spin-off/prequel of the 2016 Ultra Series series, Ultraman Orb. The series was exclusively released on Amazon Video in Japan starting from December 26, 2016 and is planned to be released in worldwide, with English and German subtitles available for international viewers.

Story

Ultraman Orb: The Origin Saga occurs before the events of Ultraman Orb, featuring Gai Kurenai/Ultraman Orb and Jugglus Juggler as allies before Juggler's fall to darkness.

Far in the distant planet O-50, two young elite warriors named Gai and Juggler reached the unexplored mountain peak called Warrior's Peak and tried to achieve the power of light. The light chooses Gai and in turn bestowed him with the Orbcalibur to transform him into Ultraman Orb. Gai's first mission as the giant of light began as both him and Juggler participated in a conflict between Royal Planet Kanon and Psychi, a scientist who plans to use the Kugutsu carried by Space Devil Bezelves to eliminate free will from the universe to create a new world under his regime. Along the way, Gai met with Asuka/Ultraman Dyna and Musashi/Ultraman Cosmos, both are Ultra Warriors from another universe who also interfered the battle. After the Kanon queen Amate transform into the War Deity, she was quickly infected by the Bezelve and almost destroy the planet's Tree of Life until the Ultras interfered and cured her. The death of Micott, a woman who admired Juggler for his swordsmanship caused the latter to acquire his transformation into his Demon Form and slayed the Tree of Life after seeing it as the source of all conflict. His action of almost endangering Kanon forced him to be banished from the planet while at the same time denouncing his role as Gai's supporter.

Meanwhile on Earth, two scientists Shohei and Yui discovered the Tree of Life's seed in an ancient temple 4,000 metres beneath Japan's sea level. As a result of touching the seed, Shohei was evolved, being able to contact Amate by the time her planet was under Psychi's invasion. The destruction of the Tree of Life caused said tree to grow on Earth as well, attracting Psychi's attention to go to said planet. When the Earth soldiers commenced their attacks on the Tree of Life, Amate stepped in and establish a contact with the Queen Bezelve until said monster sprung her trap to infect the War Deity. By this point, the Queen show its true colors by abandoning Psychi and plans to spread the Kugutsu towards the universe, resulting all life forms robbed of their free will and civilizations perish. Juggler interferes the battle again and rescued Ultraman Orb/Gai from the effects of Kugutsu under his own proxy to surpass the giants of light.

With the Queen perished by Juggler, Psychi made his final attempt by combining with her into Psyqueen and tries to destroy the Tree of Life. Gai joins his predecessors in the final battle while Shohei and Yui's will caused the Tree of Life's fruits to mature, allowing them to purify the War Deity and other Kugutsu victims. With all plan fails, Psyqueen tries to combine with the War Deity but the five Ultras open fire on the monster while Orb saved Psychi from his death. After being congratulated by his seniors, Gai visited the O-50 again where he received another mission, along with a black coloration added to Ultraman Orb, finally becoming Orb Origin.

Episodes

Cast
/: 
: 
: 
: 
: 
: 
: 
: 
: 
: 
/: 
/: 
/: 
/: 
: 
: 
:

Related media
Writer Hirotoshi Kobayashi mentioned that The Origin Saga will have its episode 0, featuring the reason why Juggler and Gai climb on the Warrior's Peak to claim Orb's power.
In celebration to the end of Ultraman Orb: The Origin Saga, Tsuburaya Productions aired a promotional clips that compile all unpublished cuts in the series.

Songs
Opening themes
"ULTRAMAN ORB"
Lyrics: 
Composition & Arrangement: 
Artists: Daisuke Asakura & Takeshi Tsuruno
Episodes: 1-7
"True Fighter"
Lyrics: 
Composition & Arrangement: Jeff Miyahara
Artists: FUTURE BOYZ
Episodes: 8-11
During the final episode, this song is played as an ending theme.
Ending themes
"Ultraman Orb  -Touch the Sun-"
Singer-songwriter: 
Composition & Arrangement: Satori Shiraishi
Episodes: 1-7

Lyrics, Composition & Arrangement: Wolves Unite
Artists: Voyager
Episodes: 8-11

Notes

References

External links
Ultraman Orb The Origin Saga at Tsuburaya Productions 

Ultra television series
Amazon Prime Video original programming
2016 web series debuts